Trusty is an American punk band formed in Little Rock, Arkansas in 1989. The band moved from Little Rock to Washington, D.C. in 1992. The group disbanded in early 1998.

History

The Little Rock Years

In 1989, the original Trusty lineup released the 7" EP "A Name to Depend On" on Soma Records. They followed this with a self-titled LP on Truant Records. Truant pressed only 1,000 copies of the record, but then re-released it as a CD with bonus tracks under the name of The Paul Years - A Trusty Retrospective. In the spring of 1992, the band recorded 7" EP Cockatoo with Josh Bentley (of The Big Cats and Substance) on bass, before relocating to the Washington, D.C. area.

In 1994 and again in 1999, the original four members of Trusty reunited and played shows in Little Rock. This lineup (Bobby Matthews, James Brady, Bircho, and Paul Bowling) reunited in 2004 to work on a CD called Sugar Smack, featuring two new tracks and a collection of unreleased outtakes. It was eventually released on Max Recordings.

The D.C. Years

Between 1992 and 1996, Trusty worked to gain respect and recognition from the established D.C. punk rock scene. In the summer of 1992, Trusty recorded the 7" EP Kathy's Keen on De Soto Records with their original drummer, Bircho. In the fall of 1992, with new bassist Brad Long (formerly of the Memphis hardcore band Sobering Consequences) and steady drummer Jim Schaffer (formerly of Washington D.C. based band Senator Flux), Trusty continued touring and writing songs for their CD Goodbye Dr. Fate, as well as several compilation CDs. Goodbye Dr. Fate was completed in the winter of 1994 and released in the spring of 1995 on Dischord Records. After extensive touring, Trusty released The Fourth Wise Man in 1996 also on Dischord and continued to tour within North America and Europe. Four years after moving from Little Rock, Trusty became the first band originating from outside Washington, D.C. to be signed by Dischord Records.

Breakup and After

In early 1998, Trusty disbanded. Bobby Matthews now sings and plays guitar in the Memphis-based band Dragoon, along with former Grifters members Tripp Lamkins and Stan Gallimore. Jim Schaffer has been playing drums with the Baltimore punk rock band, National razor, since 2002. 

Trusty's song, "Goodbye, Dr. Fate," was included on the 2002 Dischord Records compilation, 20_Years_of_Dischord. 

In 2008, Trusty signed with DC-Jam Records to re-release Demo, their first songs ever recorded (prior to being signed by Dischord).

Discography
 Demo, 1987
 A Name to Depend On (EP), Soma Records, 1989
 Trusty, Truant Records, 1990
 Cockatoo (EP), Sidekick Records, 1993
 The Paul Years (1989-1991): A Trusty Retrospective, Truant Records, 1994
 "Goodbye, Dr. Fate", Dischord Records, 1995
 The Fourth Wise Man, Dischord Records, 1996
 Sugar Smack, Max Recordings, 2006
 Demo, DC-Jam Records, 2008

References

External links
Dischord Records: Trusty. dischord.com. Retrieved February 2, 2016.

Trusty on Myspace

Dischord Records artists
American punk rock groups
Musical groups from Little Rock, Arkansas
1989 establishments in Arkansas
Musical groups established in 1989
Musical groups disestablished in 1998
Rock music groups from Arkansas